Geoffrey Williamson (10 July 1923 – 17 September 2009) was an Australian rower who competed in the 1952 Summer Olympics and in the 1956 Summer Olympics.

His senior rowing was done from the Leichhardt Rowing Club in Sydney. In 1952 he was a crew member of the Australian boat which won the bronze medal in the eights event.

Four years later he rowed on the five seat of the Australian boat which was eliminated in the semi-final of the coxless four competition.

External links

Notice of Geoff Williamson's death

1923 births
2009 deaths
Australian male rowers
Olympic rowers of Australia
Rowers at the 1952 Summer Olympics
Rowers at the 1956 Summer Olympics
Olympic bronze medalists for Australia
Olympic medalists in rowing
Medalists at the 1952 Summer Olympics
Commonwealth Games medallists in rowing
Commonwealth Games gold medallists for Australia
Commonwealth Games bronze medallists for Australia
Rowers at the 1954 British Empire and Commonwealth Games
Medallists at the 1954 British Empire and Commonwealth Games